The Pampanga Delta is a professional basketball team based in Pampanga which plays in the Philippine National Basketball League (NBL).

History
The Pampanga Delta is associated with Governor Dennis "Delta" Pineda, who also serves as coach of the team in the National Basketball League (NBL). It is credited for producing Philippine Basketball Association players, Ato Agustin and Arwind Santos.

The Pampanga Delta made their NBL debut in the 2019 season. Delta managed to advance to the final series where they lost to the Taguig Generals. Delta reached the NBL finals again in the 2020 season but were able to clinch the league title this time; overcoming La Union PAOwer. The team clinched their second NBL title in the 2021 season, at La Union's expense once again.

References

Sports in Pampanga
National Basketball League (Philippines) teams